Family is the third studio release by Californian melodic hardcore band Ignite.

Track listing
 Call on My Brothers (2:17)
 Ash Return (3:39)
 Distance (2:37)
 Slow (1:50)
 You (3:58)
 Epidemic (2:22)
 Sided (2:10)
 Family (2:21)
 Should Have Known (1:47)
 50 and a Month (3:02)

Credits
 Brett Rasmussen — Bass
 Casey Jones — Drums, Photography
 Joe D. Foster — Guitar, Photography
 Zoli Teglas — Vocals
 Jim Monroe — Producer
 Dave Mandel, Gene Rice, Jinko — Photography

References

External links

1995 albums
Ignite (band) albums